Rodeph (or Rodef) Shalom ( "Pursuer of Peace"), may refer to:

Canada
 Rodfei Sholem Anshei Kiev (Toronto), known as the Kiever Synagogue or Kiever Shul.

United States
 Congregation Rodeph Sholom (Manhattan)
 Congregation Rodeph Shalom (Philadelphia), listed on the NRHP
 Rodef Shalom Congregation, Pittsburgh, Pennsylvania, also listed on the NRHP
Rodef Shalom Biblical Botanical Garden, on the grounds of Rodef Shalom in Pittsburgh
 Rodef Sholom (San Rafael, California)
 Temple Rodef Shalom (Falls Church, Virginia)